The 17th Infantry Division is a formation of the Indian Army.  During World War II, it had the distinction of being continually in combat during the three-year-long Burma Campaign (except for brief periods of refit). The division was re-raised in 1960 and 17 Mountain Division is presently located in Sikkim under XXXIII Corps.

Second World War

The division was first raised at Ahmednagar, India under the command of Major General H V Lewis  in 1941. It consisted then of the 44th, 45th and 46th Indian Infantry Brigades, and was intended to garrison Iraq. At the end of the year, war with Imperial Japan broke out and the division was split; 44th and 45th Brigades were despatched to Malaya where 45th Brigade fought in the Battle of Muar before both brigades were lost in the Battle of Singapore; 46th Brigade and the division HQ went to Burma, where the Division was reinforced by 16th Indian Infantry Brigade and took 2nd Burma Infantry Brigade under command.

1942
The Japanese attacked Burma on January 22, 1942. It was soon apparent that the British and Indian troops in Burma were too few in number, wrongly equipped and inadequately trained for the terrain and conditions. After failing to hold the Kawkareik Pass and Moulmein, the division fell back to the Bilin River, where it was joined by 48th Indian Infantry Brigade.

The Bilin was not a proper defensive position, and the division tried to retreat over the Sittang River. Air attacks, poor organization and vehicle breakdowns delayed the division, and Japanese parties infiltrated around them to threaten the vital bridge over the Sittang. The division's commander, Major General "Jackie" Smyth VC, was forced to order the bridge to be destroyed, with most of the division cut off on the far side of the river. Only a few thousand men without equipment succeeded in crossing the river. Smyth was dismissed and replaced by Major General Cowan.

The division was reinforced with 63rd Indian Infantry Brigade, and narrowly escaped being trapped in Rangoon. After trying to hold a front in the Irrawaddy River valley, it subsequently retreated north into Assam just before the monsoon broke, fighting off a Japanese attempt to trap it at Kalewa.

1943
For the campaigning season of 1943, the division was reorganised as a "Light" formation, with two brigades only (48th and 63rd), supported by mountain artillery, and with mules and jeeps only for transport. It disputed the mountainous and jungle-covered region around Tiddim, with mixed success. The division was at the end of a long and precarious supply line, and the "light" establishment was found to be inadequate in some respects. Some heavier equipment and transport was restored.

1944
In 1944, the Japanese launched a major invasion of India. During the long Battle of Imphal, 17th Division first successfully fought its way out of encirclement at Tiddim, and then disputed the vital Bishenpur sector south of Imphal (with 32nd Indian Infantry Brigade temporarily under command). In July, the Japanese were broken by heavy casualties and starvation, and retreated. Some units of 17th Division had suffered nearly 100% casualties.

During the late monsoon season, the division was temporarily withdrawn to India and reorganised once again. 48th and 63rd Brigades were fully equipped with vehicles to become Motorized infantry. 99th Indian Infantry Brigade was added to the division, equipped to be transported by Douglas DC-3 aircraft.

1945

In late February. 1945, the motor elements of the division, with the bulk of 255th Indian Tank Brigade under command, crossed the Irrawaddy River and advanced on the vital Japanese communications centre of Meiktila. Joined by 99th Indian Infantry Brigade which was flown into the captured airfield at Thabutkon, they captured Meiktila in only four days. Reinforced by 9th Indian Infantry Brigade which was flown into the airfields around Meiktila, they subsequently withstood a Japanese siege. This Battle of Meiktila largely destroyed the Japanese armies in Central Burma.

The division now broke the last Japanese defensive position at Pyawbwe, and advanced south on Rangoon. At Pegu, it pushed Japanese rearguards aside, but was still short of its objective when the monsoon broke. Rangoon fell to an assault from the sea, Operation Dracula.

In the last months of the campaign, the division participated in the mopping up of Japanese stragglers in Burma. After the war ended, elements of it formed part of the Commonwealth Occupation force in Japan (under Cowan). The division was disbanded in India in 1946.

Order of Battle, as of May 1, 1944

General Officer Commanding – Major General David Tennent Cowan 
Commander, Royal Artillery – Brigadier the Baron de Robeck

17 Division HQ and Signals

48th Indian Infantry Brigade – (Brigadier Ronald Thomas Cameron)
9th Battalion, Border Regiment
2nd Battalion, 5th Gurkha Rifles
1st Battalion, 7th Gurkha Rifles

63rd Indian Infantry Brigade – (Brigadier Arthur Edward Cumming )
1st Battalion, 3rd Gurkha Rifles
1st Battalion, 4th Gurkha Rifles
1st Battalion, 10th Gurkha Rifles

Divisional Units
1st Battalion, West Yorkshire Regiment (attached)
4th Battalion, 12th Frontier Force Regiment (Divisional reconnaissance unit)
7th Battalion, 10th Baluch Regiment (Divisional defence / machine gun unit)

129th (Lowland) Jungle Field Regiment, Royal Artillery (RA)
21st Mountain Regiment, Indian Artillery (IA)
29th Mountain Regiment, IA
82nd Light Anti-aircraft / Anti-tank Regiment RA

60th Field Company, Indian Engineers (IE)
70th Field Company, IE
Tehri Garhwal Field Company
414th Field Park Company IE

Assigned brigades
All these brigades were assigned or attached to the division at some time during World War II
44th Indian Infantry Brigade
45th Indian Infantry Brigade
46th Indian Infantry Brigade
2nd Burma Infantry Brigade
16th Indian Infantry Brigade
48th Indian Infantry Brigade
7th Armoured Brigade
63rd Indian Infantry Brigade
37th Indian Infantry Brigade
49th Indian Infantry Brigade
32nd Indian Infantry Brigade
50th Indian Parachute Brigade
99th Indian Infantry Brigade
255th Indian Tank Brigade
9th Indian Infantry Brigade

Post independence

The division was re-raised at Ambala (India) on November 15, 1960, under the command of Major General K S Katoch . Among its new formations was 99 Infantry Brigade, which was soon detached for service with ONUC in the Congo.

Operations

Operation Vijay - The division under the command of Major General KP Candeth moved from Ambala and participated in the Goa military operations in 1961. It had two brigades under its command - 63 Brigade and 48 Brigade. The swift operations between 17 and 19 December 1961 culminated in the surrender by the Portuguese. General Candeth was immediately appointed Goa's first Indian administrator (acting as the Military Governor), a post he held till June 1962.

Sikkim - On November 15, 1963, the division relocated to Sikkim and took on the role of guarding a portion of the Tibet-India border. Under the then GOC, Major General Sagat Singh, it performed credibly during the Nathu La and Cho La clashes of 1967. The formation also played role in the merger and statehood of Sikkim in 1975. The division is presently deployed in East and South East Sikkim. It was involved in the Doklam standoff in 2017.

Formation Sign

The division had two different formation signs. The first was a lightning bolt (white) on a blue background. This was used until the middle of 1942. Major General CT Cowan decided to change the formation sign to a black cat on a yellow/orange background. It is said that the General wanted to motivate his troops to fight back the Japanese and he felt that no one fights more fiercely and aggressively than a cornered cat. The division is sometimes called The Black Cat Division based on its second and current formation sign. The present formation sign has a black background signifying an infantry division and black cat drawn with a yellow outline.

External links

Further reading
 Jon Latimer, "Burma: The Forgotten War", London: John Murray, 2004 
Memoirs
 George Macdonald Fraser, Quartered Safe Out Here (1992), a memoir of his experiences as an infantryman in the Border Regiment, part of 17th Infantry Division, during the Burma Campaign of World War II

References

Indian World War II divisions
Divisions of the Indian Army
British Indian Army divisions
Military units and formations established in 1941
Military units and formations of the British Empire in World War II
D
D
Military units and formations disestablished in 1946
Military units and formations established in 1960